Choquepirhua (possibly from Aymara chuqi gold, pirwa, piwra granary, Quechua chuqi,  metal, every kind of precious metal; gold (<Aymara), pirwa deposit, "gold granary" or "metal deposit") is a mountain in the Chila mountain range in the Andes of Peru, about  high. It lies in the Arequipa Region, Castilla Province, on the border of the districts of Chachas and Choco. Choquepirhua is situated south of Chila.

See also 
 Casiri
 Cerani
 Yuraccacsa

References 

Mountains of Peru
Mountains of Arequipa Region